Trine Østergaard Jensen (born 17 October 1991) is a Danish handball player for SG BBM Bietigheim and the Danish national team.

She represented Denmark at the 2013 World Women's Handball Championship, at the 2014 European Women's Handball Championship and at the 2015 World Women's Handball Championship.

Achievements

International competitions
EHF European League:
Winner: 2011, 2022
EHF Cup Winners' Cup:
Winner: 2015

Domestic competitions
Danish Championship:
Winner: 2011, 2013, 2015
Danish Cup:
Winner: 2012, 2014, 2020
Bundesliga:
Winner: 2022

Individual awards
Danish League Best Right Wing: 2015

References

External links

Danish female handball players
1991 births
Living people
People from Skanderborg Municipality
FCM Håndbold players
Expatriate handball players
Danish expatriate sportspeople in Germany
Sportspeople from the Central Denmark Region